During the 1993–94 English football season, Leicester City F.C. competed in the Football League First Division.

Season summary
In the 1993–1994 season, it was third time lucky for Leicester as they beat East Midlands rivals Derby County 2–1 in the final to secure promotion to the FA Premier League after seven years outside the top division. Striker David Speedie was suspended in the final, having been sent off in the semi-final against Tranmere Rovers.

Final league table

Results
Leicester City's score comes first

Legend

Football League First Division

First Division play-offs

FA Cup

League Cup

Anglo-Italian Cup

Squad

Left club during the season

References

Leicester City F.C. seasons
Leicester City